James Curley may refer to:

 James Curley (astronomer) (1796–1889), Irish-American astronomer
 James Curley (Australian politician) (1846–1913), Australian politician
 James Michael Curley (1874–1958), American politician